Dangri language may refer to:
a dialect of the Khandeshi language
the Dhanki language